Englewood Federal Detention Center is a federal detention center that is part of a complex of federal prisons in Englewood, Colorado. The complex also includes Englewood FCI and the Englewood Federal Prison Camp. The FDC consists of two units, A and B, each of which has a capacity of about 100 inmates. Inmates are kept physically separated from those in the other unit and are not allowed to communicate with them. This facility has a psychiatric staff that conducts mental health evaluations of defendants who are temporarily transferred in from all over the country pursuant to United States federal laws governing offenders with mental diseases or defects. Nathan Johnson was housed in this facility pending trial for his role in the 2008 Barack Obama assassination scare in Denver.

Buildings and structures in Arapahoe County, Colorado
Prisons in Colorado